Jackie Thomas is the self-titled debut studio album by Jackie Thomas, the winner of the first New Zealand series of The X Factor, released through Sony Music New Zealand on 9 August 2013. It debuted at number one in the New Zealand album charts and was certified Gold. The album's lead single "It's Worth It" preceded the album's release.

Background 

The album was recorded days after Thomas became the winner of the first New Zealand series of The X Factor.  The album comprises 12 tracks, 11 of which are cover versions of songs that Thomas originally performed in the live shows of The X Factor. It features her highly praised audition song "Skinny Love".  The lead single "It's Worth It" is the album's one original song.

Singles 
Following Thomas' win on the first series of The X Factor (New Zealand) on 22 July 2013, her winner's single "It's Worth It" was released for digital download and on CD, and served as the lead single from the album. The song debuted at number one and was certified Platinum. Album track "Skinny Love" also charted at 23.

Response 

In his review in the New Zealand Herald's TimeOut entertainment supplement, music writer Scott Kara described the album as appealing to fans of Jackie Thomas, but noted that, "although Thomas has a great voice, her performances are tentative". Kara singled out the versions of "Skinny Love" and "Dreams" as album highlights.

Track listing

Charts and certifications

Charts

Certifications

References 

2013 debut albums
Sony Music New Zealand albums
Jackie Thomas (singer) albums
Albums produced by Sam de Jong